The Roman Catholic Diocese of Maroua–Mokolo is a diocese located in the cities of Maroua and Mokolo in the Ecclesiastical province of Garoua in Cameroon.

History
 March 11, 1968: Established as Apostolic Prefecture of Maroua–Mokolo from the Diocese of Garoua
 January 29, 1973: Promoted as Diocese of Maroua–Mokolo

Bishops

Ordinaries, in reverse chronological order
 Bishops of Maroua–Mokolo (Roman rite), below
 Bishop Bruno Ateba Edo, S.A.C. (since April 5, 2014)
 Bishop Philippe Albert Joseph Stevens † (November 11, 1994  – April 5, 2014)
 Bishop Jacques Joseph François de Bernon, O.M.I. (January 29, 1973  – September 22, 1994); see below
 Prefect Apostolic of Maroua–Mokolo (Roman rite), below 
 Father Jacques Joseph François de Bernon, O.M.I. (March 11, 1968  – January 29, 1973); see above

Other priest of this diocese who became bishop
Barthélemy Yaouda Hourgo, appointed Bishop of Yagoua in 2008

See also
Roman Catholicism in Cameroon

References

External links
 GCatholic.org

Maroua-Mokolo
Christian organizations established in 1968
Roman Catholic dioceses and prelatures established in the 20th century
Roman Catholic Ecclesiastical Province of Garoua